Koboli is a small settlement southeast of Štanjel in the Municipality of Komen in the Littoral region of Slovenia next to the border with Italy.

References

External links

Koboli on Geopedia

Populated places in the Municipality of Komen